The Cordillera de Lípez is a mountain range in northern Potosí, Bolivia, and northern Argentina, part of the Andes. The range covers an area of 23,404 km2 (9,036 sq mi) and runs in a northeast–southwest direction, between the parallels 22 degrees and 23 degrees, helping to form the boundary between Bolivia and Argentina. Thus the Cordillera de Lípez is a transverse range in the Andes, between the Cordillera Oriental and the Cordillera Occidental, creating the southern boundary of the Bolivian Altiplano.

The highest peak is Uturunku at 6,008 m (19,711 ft). Other important peaks are Cerro Lípez (5,929 m) sometimes misidentified as Nuevo Mundo; Soniquera (5,899 m) (sometimes misspelled as Soreguera); and Tinte (5,849 m) which is on the Bolivian-Argentine border. Despite the high elevations, there is no current glacier activity in the Cordillera de Lípez, just some semi-permanent snow fields.

Notes
''Brain, Y. "Climbs and Expeditions: Bolivia", American Alpine Journal (1999) p. 323.

External links
  Sierra de Lípez, June 1, 2002 by David Yetman, in English.

Mountain ranges of Bolivia
Mountain ranges of Argentina
Argentina–Bolivia border